Abu Mohammed may refer to:
Fethi Boucetta (born 1963), aka Abu Mohammed, a citizen of Algeria who was held in extrajudicial detention in the U.S. Guantanamo Bay detention camps
Jack Letts (born 1995 or 1996), a British-Canadian member of ISIS who is said to have adopted the name Abu Mohammed